Van Hauen Pass is a mountain pass on northwestern Ellesmere Island, Nunavut, Canada.

References 

Arctic Cordillera
Mountain passes of Qikiqtaaluk Region
Ellesmere Island